Nadezhda Radzevich is a former volleyball player for the USSR.

References 

Living people
1953 births
Soviet women's volleyball players
Olympic volleyball players of the Soviet Union
Volleyball players at the 1980 Summer Olympics
Olympic gold medalists for the Soviet Union
Olympic medalists in volleyball

Medalists at the 1980 Summer Olympics